David Muriithi Ireri was an Anglican bishop in Kenya: he has been the Bishop of Embu since 2014.

References

21st-century Anglican bishops of the Anglican Church of Kenya
Anglican bishops of Embu